Listener is an American spoken word rock band from Fayetteville, Arkansas. Originally a hip hop project by Dan Smith, who used the moniker "Listener", it soon evolved into a full-fledged rock band. The current lineup consists of Smith as vocalist, trumpeter, and bassist together with guitarist Jon Terrey and drummer Kris Rochelle.

History
Listener originally started as a solo underground hip hop project of vocalist Dan Smith beginning with the commercial release of the album Whispermoon on Mush Records in 2003. He has also contributed to several collaborative albums with the groups Deepspace5 and Labklik, both of which he is a founding member of.

With his second release Ozark Empire in 2005, Smith began his first "Tour of Homes". This consisted almost entirely of traveling from home to home around the United States (the European leg of the tour was titled the "European Tour of Homes") in a grassroots style of touring. The European leg consisted more of performing in standard live music venues as well as houses, coffee shops, art galleries and warehouses. It was also during this period that Smith invited drummer Andrew Gibbens and guitarist Erik Olsen to join him on tour, thus starting the transition away from traditional hip-hop performances toward a live band format. Gibbens and Olsen remained until they departed the band in December 2006. Regardless of using the name Listener for his solo work, Smith decided to continue using the name as the project developed into a live band.

It was during the Tour of Homes in 2005 that Smith met musician Christin Nelson at a house show in Las Vegas, Nevada. After finding out that Nelson played drums, Smith asked him to join the group in June 2007 and the band released the album Return to Struggleville.

After a year and a half of touring, Listener released their third studio album, Wooden Heart, in July 2010. Later that year after being introduced to the band The Chariot, Smith was asked to collaborate on the song "David De La Hoz" on the album Long Live.

Members

Current members
 Dan Smith - vocals, bass, mellophone, cornet
 Kris Rochelle - drums
 Jon Terrey - guitar

Former members
 Christin Nelson - guitar
 Andrew Gibbens - drums
 Caleb Clendenen - guitar
 Erik Olsen - guitar
 Kristen Smith - bass
 Wolfgang Robinson - drums

Discography

Albums
 Whispermoon (Mush Records, 2003)
 Ozark Empire (Deepspace5 Records, 2005)
 Talk Music (Talk Music Records, 2007)
 Not Waving, Drowning (self-released, 2009)
 Return to Struggleville (Tangled Talk Records/Homemade Genius/Sounds of Subterrania, 2007)
 Wooden Heart (Tangled Talk Records/Sincere Records/Broken Circles/Sounds of Subterrania, 2010)
 Time Is a Machine (Tangled Talk Records/Sounds of Subterrania, 2013)
 Being Empty : Being Filled (Tangled Talk Records/Sounds of Subterrania, 2018)

EPs
 Listener and Dust – Just in Time for Christmas (Deepspace5 Records, 2005)
 Train Songs (self-released, 2009)
 Being Empty : Being Filled - Volume 1 (Black Basset Records, 2017)

Singles
 Live on 3FM (self-released, 2013)

Music Videos
 "Train Song" (2003)
 "Ozark Empire" (2005)
 "Wooden Heart" (2010)
 "Falling in Love with Glaciers" (Ver. 1) (2010)
 "Building Better Bridges" (2011)
 "Falling in Love with Glaciers" (Ver. 2) (2011)
 "It Will All Happen the Way It Should" (2014)
 "Eyes to the Ground for Change" (2014)
 "There's Money In The Walls" (2017)
 "Add Blue" (2017)
 "A Love Letter To Detroit" (2017)
 "Manhattan Projects" (2018)

References

External links
 
 

Musical groups established in 2002
Indie rock musical groups from Arkansas
2002 establishments in Arkansas
Deepspace5 members